Sulphur Springs is an unincorporated community in Perry County, in the U.S. state of Ohio.

History
Sulphur Springs was named for a mineral spring near the original town site.

References

Unincorporated communities in Perry County, Ohio
Unincorporated communities in Ohio